Dmitri Yuryevich Chesnokov (26 April 1973 – 14 December 2019) was a Russian professional footballer.

Club career
He made his debut in the Russian Premier League in 1999 for FC Saturn Ramenskoye. His former club, FC Vityaz Podolsk, announced his death on 16 December 2019, at the age of 46. The club credited him as being their top goalscorer, with 119 goals over all tournaments.

Honours
 Russian Second Division Zone Center best player: 2005.
 Russian Second Division Zone Center top scorer: 2001 (27 goals), 2005 (30 goals).

References

External links
  Profile at Footballfacts

1973 births
2019 deaths
Russian footballers
FC Saturn Ramenskoye players
Russian Premier League players
Place of birth missing
Place of death missing
FC Vityaz Podolsk players
Association football forwards
FC Novokuznetsk players